Sonja Bertram (born 14 September 1984) is a German actress.

Life and career
She spent most of her childhood in Dießen, Bavaria, the second of four children born to Josef and Gabi Bertram. She grew up with two brothers and a sister.

Her father detected Sonja's acting talent at fourteen, when she acted alongside her younger brother Tim, who made his debut appearance on screen in the movie, 'Puenktchen and Anton'.

She started her acting career in the role of Marie Ziegler in the movie 'Lieber boeser Weihnachtsmann', directed by Ben Verbong.

When she was twenty she studied singing and acting at the University of Colgne/ Aachen.

Since 2008 the actress has lived in Berlin.

Filmography
1999: Lieber böser Weihnachtsmann
2000: Ein unmöglicher Mann
2000: Bei aller Liebe
2001: Der Landarzt
2001: Anwalt Abel
2001: Unser Charly
2001: Sturmfrei
2001: Das Schneeparadies
2001: Für alle Fälle Stefanie
2002: Für alle Fälle Stefanie
2003: Um Himmels Willen
2003: Siska
2003: Medicopter 117
2006: Bravo TV Fiction
2006: Die Rosenheim-Cops
2007: Der letzte Zeuge
2008: Aktenzeichen XY… ungelöst
2009: SOKO Wismar
2010/11: Hand aufs Herz
2012: Wege zum Glück
2013: Letzte Spur Berlin
2015: 
2015: Inga Lindström - Elin und die Anderssons
2016: Chaos-Queens: Für jede Lösung ein Problem
2017: Das Traumschiff: Tansania

References

External links 
 
  Crewunited
 Website
 Sonja Bertram Agency

German television actresses
Living people
People from Frechen
German film actresses
Hochschule für Musik und Tanz Köln alumni
1984 births